Diamond Park was a 1,500-seat baseball stadium located in Edmonton, Alberta. A covered grandstand provided 500 and bleachers down the first-base line had 1,000 more seats. Constructed by a local businessman Frank Gray, who was also Edmonton's baseball club director, in 1907. Home to the Edmonton Eskimos baseball team (from 1909 to 1914, 1919-1921 and 1922), it was located on the Ross Flats below the Hotel Macdonald. The park is still known as Diamond Park and has a shaled-infield ball diamond, but the stands are gone, likely since 1935 when nearby Renfrew Park was built and replaced Diamond Park as Edmonton's main ball park.

References

1907 establishments in Alberta
Defunct baseball venues in Canada
Sports venues in Edmonton
Sports venues completed in 1907
Defunct minor league baseball venues
Baseball venues in Alberta